The 2008 NHRA Full Throttle Drag Racing Series consisted of 24 national events held at tracks across the U.S.  The first 18 events made up the regular season, with the final events making up the "Countdown to 1".
This season marked the introduction of 1000' drag racing for the nitro competitors after the death of Funny Car driver Scott Kalitta in Englishtown, N.J. John Force returned to competition after his near fatal crash in Dallas toward the end of the 2007 Season. John's daughter Ashley became the first female funny car winner beating her father John in the finals at Atlanta. This season also marked the most dominant season by a professional driver in history, as Tony Schumacher won 15 races and became the only driver in the countdown era to clinch the championship before the season finale.

Schedule

Points standings

Drivers in bold have clinched the championship

References

NHRA
NHRA Full Throttle